Olives and Their Oil is a 1914 educational short film about the production of olive oil. The film was released by Keystone Studios on February 7, 1914, on a split reel with the Charlie Chaplin comedy Kid Auto Races at Venice.

References

External links

1914 films
American silent short films
American black-and-white films
1910s short documentary films
Olive oil
Documentary films about agriculture
1914 documentary films
Black-and-white documentary films
American short documentary films
1910s American films